The 1915–16 Ottawa Senators season was the Ottawa Hockey Club's 31st season of play. After winning the NHA championship in 1915, the Senators failed to defend the championship, which was won by the Montreal Canadiens.

Team business
Frank Nighbor, who had played for Vancouver in the Stanley Cup signed with Ottawa, starting a long-time association. The Senators were accused of trying to sign Cyclone Taylor to return to Ottawa while signed with Vancouver, part of an ongoing 'war' with the Pacific Coast Hockey Association. Taylor, who would remain in Vancouver, was considered Wanderers' property by its manager Sam Lichtenhein. Hamby Shore held out and did not sign with the club until December 29.

Regular season

Highlights
On February 23, 1916, Gordon Roberts of the Wanderers drew a match penalty for cutting Ottawa's Frank Nighbor in a game in Montreal. On the next visit of the Wanderers to Ottawa, Roberts was pelted with bottles from the Ottawa fans.

Billy Gilmour, a former star with Ottawa in the "Silver Seven" era, played two games with Ottawa, scoring one goal.

Final standings

Results

Scoring leaders

Leading Goaltenders

See also
1915–16 NHA season

References

 

Ottawa Senators (original) seasons
Ottawa
Ott